"This Is My Song" is a popular song.

It was composed by Dick Charles, a pseudonym of Richard Charles Krieg, on August 23, 1950, and published on December 31, 1951.

It was recorded by Patti Page in 1953, and issued by Mercury Records as catalog number 70183. It entered the Billboard chart on August 8, 1953, at  number 20, lasting one week. The song also became Patti Page's television theme song.

References

1951 songs
Songs written by Dick Charles